Dr. Sadashivayya Jambayya Nagalotimath (20 July 1940 – 24 October 2006) was an Indian medical scientist and writer. He also served as the Director of Karnataka Institute of Medical Sciences, Hubli.  He died on 24 October 2006 at the KLE Society's Hospital at the age of 66.

References

External links 
 Articles on Google Scholar

Scientists from Karnataka
1940 births
2006 deaths
Indian medical writers
People from Gadag-Betageri